Ozarkodinida is an extinct conodont order. It is part of the clade Prioniodontida, also known as the "complex conodonts".

Name
Ozarkodinida is named after the Ozark Mountains of Missouri, United States.

Elements 
The feeding apparatus of ozarkodinids is composed at the front of an axial Sa element, flanked by two groups of four close-set elongate Sb and Sc elements which were inclined obliquely inwards and forwards. Above these elements lay a pair of arched and inward pointing (makellate) M elements. Behind the S-M array lay transversely oriented and bilaterally opposed (pectiniform, i.e. comb-shaped) Pb and Pa elements.

References

External links 
 

 

 
Prehistoric jawless fish orders